Guido Breña López (July 9, 1931 – July 9, 2013) was a Peruvian Roman Catholic bishop. Ordained a priest in 1954, Breña López was named bishop of the Roman Catholic Diocese of Ica in 1973 and retired in 2007.

Notes

1931 births
2013 deaths
20th-century Roman Catholic bishops in Peru
21st-century Roman Catholic bishops in Peru
Roman Catholic bishops of Ica